Eugène Durocher (27 August 1881 – 10 May 1944) was a Canadian politician, serving in municipal and national politics. He was born in Montreal, Quebec and became an insurance broker by career.

From 1938 to 1940, Durocher was a municipal alderman for Montreal, serving on the Montreal Metropolitan Commission in 1939.

He was first elected to the House of Commons of Canada as a Liberal party member at St. James riding in a by-election on 18 December 1939, due to the death of incumbent Fernand Rinfret. He was re-elected there in the 1940 election. Before completing his term in the 19th Canadian Parliament, Durocher died at Hôtel-Dieu hospital in Montreal on 10 May 1944 after poor health for two weeks.

References

External links
 

1881 births
1944 deaths
Businesspeople from Montreal
Liberal Party of Canada MPs
Members of the House of Commons of Canada from Quebec
Politicians from Montreal
Quebec municipal councillors
Businesspeople in insurance